The women's doubles badminton tournament at the 2020 Summer Olympics took place from 24 July to 2 August at the Musashino Forest Sport Plaza at Tokyo. There were 16 pairs (32 players) from 14 nations competing.

Greysia Polii and Apriyani Rahayu of Indonesia won the gold medal. It was their first Olympic medal, the country's first from badminton women's doubles, and the only gold won by the contingent in Tokyo 2020 Olympics. Indonesia also became the second country to have won all five Olympic badminton events, after China in London 2012 Olympics.

Background
This was the 8th appearance of the event as a full medal event. Badminton was introduced as a demonstration sport in 1972 (without women's doubles), held again as an exhibition sport in 1988, and added to the full programme in 1992; the women's doubles tournament had been held since.

The reigning champions were Misaki Matsutomo and Ayaka Takahashi of Japan, who were not defending their title following Takahashi's retirement. Japan has two of the three top-ranked qualifiers, however, with Yuki Fukushima and Sayaka Hirota (#1) and Mayu Matsumoto and Wakana Nagahara (#3). Matsumoto and Nagahara were the reigning world champions, defeating Fukushima and Hirota in the final. China, which had won 5 of the previous 7 editions of the women's doubles, had the #2-ranked pair Chen Qingchen and Jia Yifan.

Qualification

The badminton qualification system provided for 16 women's doubles teams (32 players). Following revisions due to the COVID-19 pandemic, the qualifying periods were 29 April 2019 to 15 March 2020 and 4 January to 13 June 2021, with the ranking list of 15 June 2021 controlling qualification.

Qualification was done entirely through the ranking list. Nations with at least two pairs in the top 8 were able to send a maximum of 2 pairs (4 players); all other nations were limited to a single pair. Pairs were taken from the ranking list in order, respecting those national limits, until 16 pairs were selected. However, each continent was guaranteed to have at least one pair with the lowest-ranking pairs displaced if necessary to make room for a continental guarantee.

Competition format
The tournament started with a group phase round-robin. There were four groups of four teams each; the top two highest-ranked pairs from each group advanced to a knockout stage. The knockout stage was a three-round single-elimination tournament with a bronze medal match.

Matches were played best-of-three games. Each game was played to 21, except that a pair must win by 2 unless the score reached 30–29.

Seeds
 (quarter-finals)
 (silver medalists)
 (quarter-finals)
 (fourth place)

Schedule
The tournament was held over a 10-day period, with 7 competition days and 3 open days.

Group stage

Group A

Group B

Group C

Group D

Finals
The quarter-finals were held on 29 July 2021, the semi-finals on 31 July, and the medal matches on 2 August 2021.

References

External links
Group play 

Badminton at the 2020 Summer Olympics
Women's events at the 2020 Summer Olympics